Hans Olov Lindgren (6 January 1932 - 2 November 2012) was a Swedish actor, screenwriter and film producer.

Lindgren was born in 1932 in Österåker, north of Stockholm, Sweden. He had his acting debut as a 10-year-old in 1942 in Vårat gäng by Gunnar Skoglund and starred in more than 40 film and television productions including Rännstensungar (1944), Barnen från Frostmofjället (1945) (where he starred Ante), Svenska Floyd (1961), and Bombi Bitt och jag (1968). In later years, Lindgren worked for the Riksteatern. He was married to Harriet Anna-Lisa Lindgren (1939–2007). Hans narrated Ole Lukøje (Ol Dreamy) for the film The Snow Queen.

Selected filmography
 Guttersnipes (1944)
 The Saucepan Journey (1950)
 Defiance (1952)
 Heart's Desire (1960)

References

External links

1932 births
2012 deaths
Swedish male actors